Dorma is a small village or hamlet in Torpa Block, Khunti District, Jharkhand, India. It comes under Domra Panchayath.

Geography

Dorma is surrounded by Rania Block to the south, Kamdara Block to the west, Murhu Block to the east, and Karra Block to the north. Khunti, Ranchi, Gumla, and Chakradharpur are nearby cities.
It is in the border of the Khunti District and Gumla District. Gumla District Kamdara is west from Dorma.

Physiography
Uneven plains and some rocky mountains lie as this region comes under plateau region of Chotta Nagpur.

Demographics
Hindi is the local language. Most of the population are Munda people, speaking Mundari language.

Transport

Railway
There is no railway station near to Dorma in less than 10 km. However, Hatia Rail Way Station is major railway station 52 km near to Dorma

Roadway
Roads connecting major cities are providing movement for passenger and freight traffic. There is a district road connecting Torpa, Murhu, Govindpur and Ranchi.

Schools and colleges
Colleges near Dorma is St Joseph Intermediate College, Torpa.Nirmala High School Dorma,

References

Cities and towns in Khunti district